Beaver Chief Falls is a waterfall located in Glacier National Park, Montana, US. Below the hanging valley lies Lincoln Lake, where the cascades end. Somewhat inaccessible, the falls require a nearly  round-trip hike to visit.

References

Landforms of Glacier National Park (U.S.)
Waterfalls of Glacier National Park (U.S.)